Timothy W. V. McMullan (born 1963 in Lambeth, London, England) is an English actor, notable for his stage, television and film work. He trained at the Royal Academy of Dramatic Arts after obtaining a degree at the University of St. Andrews.

His stage work includes a 2008 adaptation of The Misanthrope alongside Damian Lewis and Keira Knightley along with the 2003 adaptation of His Dark Materials. In 2009 he was in  Dominic Dromgoole Shakespeare's Globe production of As You Like It and worked for Complicite. In 2016, again for Dromgoole, he was Prospero in The Tempest at the Sam Wanamaker Playhouse.

In 2017 McMullan played Sir Toby Belch in a production of Twelfth Night on the Olivier stage at the Royal National Theatre.

In July 2020 Deadline announced that PBS’ Masterpiece would adapt Anthony Horowitz's Magpie Murders novel into a six-part drama series and air it in the US, and on BritBox in the UK. Horowitz prepared the script and Masterpiece produced the series along with Jill Green and Eleventh Hour Films. McMullan was signed to portray the character of Atticus Pünd after actor Timothy Spall pulled out of the production due to scheduling issues.

Selected filmography
Shadowlands (1993)
Stalag Luft (1993)
The Fifth Element (1997)
The Queen (2006)
Margaret (2009)
Henry IV, Part II (2012)
The Woman in Black (2012)
Foyle's War (2013)
Endeavour (2014)
The Crown (2019)
Enola Holmes 2 (2022)
Magpie Murders (2022)

References

External links

Living people
People educated at Aldro
Alumni of RADA
British male stage actors
British male television actors
British male film actors
20th-century British male actors
21st-century British male actors
1963 births